Klaus von Klitzing (born 28 June 1943, Schroda) is a German physicist, known for discovery of the integer quantum Hall effect, for which he was awarded the 1985 Nobel Prize in Physics.

Education
In 1962, Klitzing passed the Abitur at the Artland-Gymnasium in Quakenbrück, Germany, before studying physics at the Braunschweig University of Technology, where he received his diploma in 1969. He continued his studies at the University of Würzburg at the chair of Gottfried Landwehr, completing his PhD thesis entitled Galvanomagnetic Properties of Tellurium in Strong Magnetic Fields in 1972, and gaining habilitation in 1978.

Research and career
During his career Klitzing has worked at the Clarendon Laboratory at the University of Oxford and the Grenoble High Magnetic Field Laboratory in France (now LNCMI), where he continued to work until becoming a professor at the Technical University of Munich in 1980. He has been a director of the Max Planck Institute for Solid State Research in Stuttgart since 1985.

The von Klitzing constant, RK = h/e2 =  is named in honor of Klaus von Klitzing's discovery of the quantum Hall effect, and is listed in the National Institute of Standards and Technology Reference on Constants, Units, and Uncertainty. The inverse of the constant is equal to half the value of the conductance quantum.

More recently, Klitzing's research focuses on the properties of low-dimensional electronic systems, typically in low temperatures and in high magnetic fields.

Honours and awards
Von Klitzing has won numerous awards and honours including:

 1981 Walter Schottky Prize
 1982 EPS Europhysics Prize
 1982 Hewlett-Packard Prize
 1985 Nobel Prize in Physics
 1985 Directorate for life at the Max Planck Institute for Solid State Research
 1986 Golden Plate Award of the American Academy of Achievement
 1986 Order of Merit of Baden-Württemberg
 1988 Honorary Doctorate from the Technical University of Karl-Marx-Stadt
 1988 Bavarian Maximilian Order for Science and Art
 1988 Dirac Medal
 1992 Honorary Degree (Doctor of Science) from the University of Bath
 1999 Honorary Member of the German Physical Society
 2003 Elected a Foreign Member of the Royal Society (ForMemRS)
 2005 Carl Friedrich Gauss Medal of the Brunswick Scientific Society
 2006 Honorary Doctorate of the University of Oldenburg
 2007 Member of the Chinese Academy of Sciences
 2007 Member of the Pontifical Academy of Sciences
 2009 Austrian Decoration for Science and Art
 2012 Distinguished Affiliated Professor at the Technical University of Munich
 2016 Honoris Causa Doctorate of the Universidad Nacional de San Martín
 2019 Pour le Mérite for Sciences and Arts
 Professor von Klitzing Strasse in Quakenbrück and Klaus von Klitzing Strasse in Landau are named after von Klitzing
2019 Fray International Sustainability Award given at SIPS 2019 by FLOGEN Star Outreach

References

External links

  including the Nobel Lecture, 9 December 1985 The Quantized Hall Effect

1943 births
Living people
People from Środa Wielkopolska
University of Würzburg alumni
Technical University of Braunschweig alumni
Academic staff of the Technical University of Munich
Semiconductor physicists
Nobel laureates in Physics
21st-century German physicists
German Nobel laureates
Foreign associates of the National Academy of Sciences
Foreign Members of the Russian Academy of Sciences
Foreign Members of the Royal Society
Max Planck Society people
Recipients of the Order of Merit of Baden-Württemberg
Foreign members of the Chinese Academy of Sciences
Members of the Pontifical Academy of Sciences
Recipients of the Austrian Decoration for Science and Art
Grand Crosses with Star and Sash of the Order of Merit of the Federal Republic of Germany
Recipients of the Pour le Mérite (civil class)
20th-century German physicists
Max Planck Institute directors
Fellows of the American Physical Society